"Central Reservation" is a song by Beth Orton, released as a single in 1999. It was released as the second single from the album of the same title, using the "Then Again version" of the song instead of the original acoustic version. It peaked at #37 in the UK Singles Chart.

A video to promote the single was filmed in New York City, produced by Sophie Muller.

Track listing
CD1 Heavenly / HVN 92CD1

 "Central Reservation" (The Then Again Version) – 3:57 
 "Central Reservation" (Spiritual Life / Ibadan Remix) – 8:50  
 "Central Reservation" (William Orbit Remix) – 4:41

CD2 Heavenly / HVN 92CD2
 "Central Reservation" (Deep Dish Modern Red Neck Remix - Edit) – 3:59 
 "Central Reservation" (Deep Dish Modern Red Neck Remix) – 8:07
 "Central Reservation" (Deep Dish Modern Red Neck 2000 Dub) – 7:47

12" Heavenly / HVN 9212
 "Central Reservation" (Spiritual Life / Ibadan Remix) – 7:55
 "Central Reservation" (Deep Dish Modern Red Neck 2000 Dub) – 8:04

References

Beth Orton songs
1999 singles
1999 songs
Heavenly Recordings singles
Songs written by Beth Orton